Richard Harvey Vertlieb (October 7, 1930 – December 5, 2008) was an American sports executive. He was the winner of the 1975 NBA Executive of the Year Award after serving as general manager for the NBA Champion Golden State Warriors. He also served as general manager for the Seattle SuperSonics and Indiana Pacers, as well as the Seattle Mariners of Major League Baseball. He died in Las Vegas, Nevada after a lengthy illness.

Dick was born in Watts, Los Angeles, California. He graduated from the University of Southern California, and also served in the United States army. He helped found the Portland Trail Blazers and the Seattle SuperSonics, becoming the Sonics' first ever General Manager prior to their inaugural season in 1967–68. During his time in Seattle, he named Lenny Wilkens as the head coach; Wilkens has gone on to become the coach with most career victories in NBA history. Vertlieb then went to Golden State, where he gave the team a facelift and led them to the NBA title. He returned the Warriors to the Western Conference final the following year, but was defeated by the Phoenix Suns, who then lost to the Boston Celtics in the finals. Vertlieb then returned to Seattle to serve as the first ever GM for the Seattle Mariners, as they began play in Major League Baseball in 1977. Vertlieb's final GM job came in 1980–81 with the Indiana Pacers. In 1995, he served a brief stint as a consultant for the expansion Vancouver Grizzlies of the NBA, before becoming involved with the World League's Amsterdam Admirals.

References

External links

Dan Raley. End game for Seattle sports guru. Seattle Post-Intelligencer. 12 August 2004. Retrieved 9 September 2007.

1930 births
2008 deaths
Golden State Warriors executives
Indiana Pacers executives
National Basketball Association executives
Seattle Mariners executives
Seattle SuperSonics general managers
University of Southern California alumni